Simhasanam is a 2012 Malayalam action film written and directed by Shaji Kailas starring Prithviraj Sukumaran and Sai Kumar with supporting cast including Siddique, Devan, Jayakrishnan, Biju Pappan, Thilakan, Vandana Menon and Aishwarya Devan. The music was composed by Ronnie Raphael.

Simhasanam was initially intended to be a remake of the cult Mohanlal-starrer Naduvazhikal but on scripting, it deviated so much from the original story that, it is no longer a rehashed version of the 1989 hit. So they made it as a loosely based adaptation of Mario Puzo's The Godfather.

Premise
Chandragiriyil Arjun is a student in Manipal and the son of Chandragiriyil Madhava Menon, a landlord in Chandragiri, Thiruvananthapuram. One day, Arjun is called from Manipal and learns about constants struggles between his enemy Raman Unni, who runs a franchise of grocery stores. Arjun decides to restore order and secretly fight back Raman Unni and his brothers as his father doesn't want him to become violent.

Cast
Prithviraj as Chandragiriyil Arjun Madhavan / Arjunan
Sai Kumar as Chandragiriyil G.Madhava Menon
Siddique as Ramanunni
Devan as Bhargavanunni
Jayakrishnan as Krishnanunni
Biju Pappan as Jamal
Thilakan as Bishop
Vandana Menon as Lakshmi (Lechu)
Aishwarya Devan as Nanda
P. Sreekumar as Chief Minister Chacko
Kollam Ajith as Razool Musthafa
Riyaz Khan as Superintendent of Police Vettrivel Maran
Manikuttan as Suresh, Arjun's friend
Rajeev Parameshwar as Lokan, Arjun's Friend
Vishnu Priyan as Govindan, Arjun's friend
Irshad as Adv. Manilal
Vijayakumar as S.P Chandrashekharan
T. P. Madhavan as Issac
Shammi Thilakan as V. S. Nair
Ramu as Kuruvila Jacob
Kunchan as Pisharadi
V. K. Sreeraman as Kollamkottu Krishna Sharmma 
Jayan Cherthala as Mukundan Cheriyapally
Sana as Hemalatha Gundappa
Santhosh as Bhaskaran
Pradeep Chandran as Cheriyappilli Peethambaran
Nandu Poduval as Khader
Gayathri
Geetha Nair
Rema Devi
Gayathri Priya

Soundtrack 
The music was composed by Ronnie Raphael and the lyrics were penned by Chitoor Gopi.

Reception
Simhasanam  was released on 10 August 2012 and received negative reviews from critics and became a box-office bomb.

The Times of India wrote "Simhasanam flimsily pieces together some of the most celebrated cinematic moments that Malayalam viewers have watched and relished countless times. It is nothing more than a foiled attempt to craft a film with one-liners, prolonged dialogues and action sequences."

Lensmen criticized the film and wrote "Overall, Simhasanam is an outdated mix of old hit movies. Only die hard Prithviraj fans will find this movie interesting. Simahasanam is not written and directed by Shaji Kailas. It is arranged and organized by him. " Rediff criticized the film saying that it "is a mixture of the director's hits post-1990s, a patchwork of a story with nothing for the viewer to take back".

Trivia
Simhasanam is the only film in which Shaji Kailas directed a film with the script written by him, as his previous family background films such as Aaraam Thampuran, Narasimham and Madirasi were from scripts written by Ranjith and Rajesh Jayaraman. This is  the first time that Shaji Kailas directed a film with Prithviraj Sukumaran in the lead role.

References

External links
 

2010s Malayalam-language films
Films shot in Palakkad
Films shot in Ottapalam
Indian family films
Fictional rivalries
Films about father–son relationships
Films directed by Shaji Kailas